Wayambo may refer to:

 Wayamboweg, a resort (municipality) in Suriname
 Wayambo River, a river in Suriname